Wong Tai Sin District is one of the 18 districts of Hong Kong. It is the only landlocked district in Hong Kong. It is located in Kowloon, and is the northernmost district in Kowloon. It borders the districts of Kwun Tong to its southeast, Kowloon City to its southwest, Sai Kung to its east, and Sha Tin to its north.

Geography
The district contains the areas of Diamond Hill, Wang Tau Hom, Lok Fu, Chuk Yuen, Wong Tai Sin, Tsz Wan Shan, Fung Wong, Choi Hung and Choi Wan, an area that includes several major public housing estates.

Demographics
Wong Tai Sin District has a population of 444,630 (2001 figures). The district has the least educated residents with the lowest income, the oldest residents and the second highest population density. Over 85% of the district's residents live in public housing.

Religion
The district derives its name from the Wong Tai Sin Temple, dedicated to Wong Tai Sin, which is located there. The district is also the location of the Chi Lin Nunnery, built in the Tang Dynasty style, a popular tourist attraction.

Education

Schools in Wong Tai Sin District include:
 Our Lady's Primary School, established in 1953
 Wong Tai Sin Catholic Primary School, established in 1962.
 Bishop Walsh Primary School, established in 1963.
 Baptist Rainbow Primary School, established in 1984.

Transport
Wong Tai Sin is served by Lung Cheung Road and the Kwun Tong line of the MTR metro system. The stations are Lok Fu, Wong Tai Sin, Diamond Hill and Choi Hung. Diamond Hill is also a station of Tuen Ma line. The old airport was located just behind this district.

Gallery

See also
 List of places in Hong Kong

References

External links
 Wong Tai Sin District Council
 District Council Election 2007 - Electoral Boundary Maps - Wong Tai Sin (6.7MB pdf file)
 Wong Tai Sin 黃大仙 Articles on, and photos and videos of, the district and places accessible from Wong Tai Sin station.